The 6th Annual Nickelodeon Kids' Choice Awards was held on November 14, 1992, at Universal Studios Hollywood. Holly Robinson, Brian Austin Green, and Tori Spelling hosted the show. This would be the last KCA broadcast until the 1994 show, as the network didn't air a show in 1993.

This was the first Kids' Choice Awards ceremony to be held live.

Performers

The cast of Roundhouse performed during the opening and closing of the show.

Winners and nominees
Winners are listed first, in bold. Other nominees are in alphabetical order.

Movies

Television

Music

Sports

Special Recognition

Hall of Fame
 Arnold Schwarzenegger
 Bill Cosby
 Michael Jordan

References

External links
 

Nickelodeon Kids' Choice Awards
Kids' Choice Awards
Kids' Choice Awards
Kids